Waterfront is a syndicated half-hour American television drama series that starred Preston Foster as the captain of the harbor tug Cheryl Ann.  The series was filmed 1954-1955 by Roland Reed Productions, Inc., for the Ziv Company, in part on location at the Port of Los Angeles.  Although Foster had been a Broadway, Vaudeville, and Hollywood actor since his 20's, he grew up in coastal cities in New Jersey, worked as a clerk for a shipping company when he was 20, and was an officer in the United States Coast Guard during World War II.  He was quoted as insisting on authenticity where possible in the production.

Production 
Preston Foster portrayed Captain John Herrick, a tugboat captain at Los Angeles Harbor, operating from Berth 14 in San Pedro, in 78 episodes, production of which concluded in 1955. It also starred Douglas Dick, Lois Moran, Willie Best and Harry Lauter.

Stated Foster, “On Waterfront, I insisted that we use the real locale. We went down to Los Angeles harbor and got a lot of good background shots. The Coast Guard supplied the equipment we needed, and I even learned how to handle the tugboat myself.”

The actor left the program to make the pilot for a new program, “Test Pilot,” which, ultimately, did not make it into series production. Foster explained that the end of Waterfront was a financial decision. 

“We’ve made 78 of them,” he said. “That’s enough for two years, including 26 weeks of reruns. The show is still riding high, and we could probably make more.

“But the profit is in the second runs. It’s important to sell them in the second-run market while the show’s popularity is high; you get a better price for them.

“Now is when the producers cash in on the investment. So far they haven’t made a profit. I’m the only one who has - because I was under salary.”

Episodes

Season 1 (1954)

Season 2 (1954-1955)

References

External links

 Waterfront (1954-55) at CVTA

First-run syndicated television programs in the United States
1954 American television series debuts
1955 American television series endings
Black-and-white American television shows
English-language television shows
1950s American drama television series
Nautical television series
Television shows filmed in Los Angeles
Television shows set in Los Angeles